The Landesliga is a tier of football in some states of the German football league system.

In Bavaria, Saxony, Thuringia, Bremen, Lower Saxony and Hamburg, the Landesligas are set right below the Oberliga and therefore are the sixth tier. The reason for this is that Bavaria, Hamburg, Lower Saxony, and Bremen are the only places in Germany where the Oberliga, the State, and the Verband are geographically the same, while the other two states simply chose to call their leagues Landesligas when establishing them in 1990. In the Middle Rhine and Lower Rhine regions of North Rhine-Westphalia it is also, since 2012, the sixth tier.

In Baden-Württemberg, Rhineland-Palatinate (southwestern part only), North Rhine-Westphalia (Westphalia), Mecklenburg-Western Pomerania, Brandenburg, Saxony-Anhalt, and Berlin, the Landesliga is the seventh tier, below the Verbandsliga. In the Saarland, the Landesligas are set as the eighth tier.

Typically, in each Bundesland, the Landesligas are divided into different Staffeln or "divisions". In Bavaria, the Landesliga is divided into five divisions, South-West, South-East, Central, North-West, and North-East. In Saxony, Bremen, and Thuringia, the Landesliga is in a single division format. In Hamburg, it consists of two divisions.

In 2017, Schleswig-Holstein introduced Landesligas at the sixth tier, leaving Hesse as the only German state not to have Landesligas. The Rheinland region of Rhineland-Palatinate also operates without such a league. 

In Brandenburg, Mecklenburg-Western Pomerania, Saxony, Saxony-Anhalt, and Thuringia the league below the Landesligas is the Landesklasse. Also in 2017, Mecklenburg-Western Pomerania reduced the number of Landesligas and Landesklasses to 2 and 4 divisions respectively, but temporarily reverted them to 3 and 5 divisions for two seasons in 2020.

Leagues

Tier-VI Landesligas
Of the 69 Landesligas in Germany 20 are set at tier six of the German football league system, these being:

 The Landesligas of Thuringia and Saxony are unique in their naming as every other league in Germany of this standing carries the name Verbandsliga. This was done so simply by choice of the local football associations in Saxony and Thuringia and the name could be changed to Verbandsliga if they wish to do so. Bavaria does not have this option however, since its Landesligas are not the highest leagues in the Verband. This position is held by the Oberligas in this state.

Tier VII-Landesligas
Apart from the above-mentioned states, Landesligas also exist in the states of Baden-Württemberg, Rhineland-Palatinate (in the southwest part only), North Rhine-Westphalia (Westphalia), Mecklenburg-Western Pomerania, Brandenburg, Saxony-Anhalt, Berlin and as Landesklasse, in Saxony and Thuringia as tier seven leagues, below the Verbandsligas:

Tier VIII-Landesligas
Uniquely, the Saarland has the Landesligas as the eighth tier of its league system; in Brandenburg, Mecklenburg-Western Pomerania, and Saxony-Anhalt the equivalent tier is Landesklasse.

References

External links
 Das deutsche Fußball-Archiv 
 DFB: State Associations

 
6
Germany